Dixville  is a town and northern suburb of Monrovia, Liberia, to the north of Kaba Town.

References

Suburbs of Monrovia